In enzymology, an O-demethylpuromycin O-methyltransferase is an enzyme that catalyzes the chemical reaction

S-adenosyl-L-methionine + O-demethylpuromycin  S-adenosyl-L-homocysteine + puromycin

Thus, the two substrates of this enzyme are S-adenosyl methionine and O-demethylpuromycin, whereas its two products are S-adenosylhomocysteine and puromycin.

This enzyme belongs to the family of transferases, specifically those transferring one-carbon group methyltransferases.  The systematic name of this enzyme class is S-adenosyl-L-methionine:O-demethylpuromycin O-methyltransferase. This enzyme is also called O-demethylpuromycin methyltransferase.  This enzyme participates in puromycin biosynthesis.

References

 

EC 2.1.1
Enzymes of unknown structure